Mentada de padre is a 2019 Mexican comedy film directed by Mark Alazraki and Fernando Rovzar, based from a screenplay by William Sutcliffe. The film is set in Mexico in 1942. And it revolves around the four children of Don Lauro Márquez Castillo (Héctor Suárez), a man who on his deathbed, asks his children to show who deserves to bear the last name Márquez Castillo. It premiered in Mexico on 16 August 2019.

Cast 
 Héctor Suárez as Don Lauro Márquez Castillo
 Osvaldo Benavides as Fausto Márquez Castillo
 Antonio Gaona as Abel Márquez Castillo
 Mauricio Isaac as Tadeo Márquez Castillo
 Mauricio Barrientos as Iker Márquez Castillo
 Sofía Sisniega as Lily
 Ximena Romo as Rosa
 Gerardo Taracena as Lider Rebeldes
 Roger Cudney as Williams

References

External links 
 

Mexican comedy films
Films set in Mexico
Films set in 1942
2010s Mexican films